Marcos Nogueira Eberlin (born 4 March 1959) is a Brazilian chemist and former professor at the Institute of Chemistry of the University of Campinas. He is a member of the Brazilian Academy of Sciences and received the Brazilian National Order of Scientific Merit in 2005 and the Thomson Medal in 2016.

Eberlin discovered the Eberlin Reaction during his work on gas phase ion chemistry, and he and his research group introduced EASI (Easy Ambient Sonic-spray Ionization), an ionization technique used in mass spectrometry.

Eberlin is an advocate of intelligent design in Brazil, a pseudoscience on which he also lectures and he has signed the Dissent From Darwinism statement. He is a creationist also, and has said that evolution theory is a fallacy. During the COVID-19 pandemic, Eberlin supported the use of medications without proven efficacy such as hydroxychloroquine.

His daughter, Livia S. Eberlin, is also a chemist who won the MacArthur "Genius" Fellowship in 2018 for her research on the use of mass spectrometry to diagnose cancer. 
Eberlin and his daughter have worked together on a different project, using mass spectrometry to detect counterfeit money.

References

External links

Page at University of Campinas
Waters Biography

Mass spectrometrists
Living people
Intelligent design advocates
State University of Campinas alumni
Brazilian chemists
1959 births
Academic staff of the State University of Campinas
Thomson Medal recipients